Monte Batalha is a mountain in the island of Maio in Cape Verde. Its elevation is 294 m. It is situated 4 km southeast of Calheta and 8 km northeast of the island capital Porto Inglês.

See also
 List of mountains in Cape Verde

References

Batalha
Geography of Maio, Cape Verde